Fındıklı District is a district of the Rize Province of Turkey. Its seat is the town of Fındıklı. Its area is 383 km2, and its population is 16,487 (2021).

Composition
There is one municipality in Fındıklı District:
 Fındıklı

There are 23 villages in Fındıklı District:

 Arılı
 Aslandere
 Avcılar
 Beydere
 Cennet
 Çağlayan
 Çınarlı
 Derbent
 Doğanay
 Düzköy
 Gürsu
 Hara
 Ihlamurlu
 Karaali
 Kıyıcık
 Meyvalı
 Saatköy
 Sulak
 Sümer
 Tepecik
 Yaylacılar
 Yeniköy
 Yenişehitlik

References

Districts of Rize Province